Miss USA 2008 was the 57th Miss USA pageant, held in Las Vegas, Nevada on April 11, 2008.  At the conclusion of the final night of competition, Crystle Stewart of Texas was crowned the winner by outgoing titleholder Rachel Smith of Tennessee. Crystle represented the United States at the Miss Universe 2008 pageant, which was held in Vietnam, where she placed in the Top 10. This was also the first time in the pageant's 56-year history that two consecutive women of African Americans have been crowned.

The pageant was held at the Theatre for the Performing Arts, a 7,000-seat theater located in the Planet Hollywood Resort and Casino.  The theater was also the location of Miss Universe 1991 and 1996 pageants. This is the first time that the Miss USA pageant was held in Nevada.

For the first time, the competition was broadcast in High Definition.

Brother/sister duo Donny and Marie Osmond hosted the live telecast for the first time, and Finger Eleven performed their single "Paralyzer". Rihanna's song Umbrella was used during the evening gown competition.

During the final show on April 11, the fifteen delegates with the highest average scores from the preliminary competition were announced.  The top fifteen competed in the swimsuit competition.  The top ten delegates from swimsuit competed in evening gown.  The top five delegates from the evening gown competition (not averaged composite scores from both competitions) competed in the final question round to determine the winner.  The judges' composite score was shown after each round of competition for only the second time since 2002.

Selection of contestants
One delegate from each state and the District of Columbia were chosen in state pageants held from June 2007 to January 2008.

Results

Placements

Special awards

Final competition scores

 Winner 
 First Runner-Up
 Second Runner-Up 
 Third Runner-Up
 Fourth Runner-Up
 Top 10
 Top 15
 Rank in each round of competition

Historical significance 
 Texas wins competition for the ninth time.
 Mississippi earns the 1st runner-up position for the first time and surpasses its previous highest placement from 1986, becoming its highest placement of the state until 2020.
 New Jersey earns the 2nd runner-up position for the third time. The last time it placed this was in 1990.
 Oklahoma earns the 3rd runner-up position for the second time. The last time it placed this was in 2004.
 Pennsylvania earns the 4th runner-up position for the first time and reaches its highest placement since 1993.
 States that placed in semifinals the previous year were California, Missouri, Rhode Island, South Carolina, Tennessee, Texas and Utah.
 Texas placed for the eighth consecutive year.
 California placed for the fourth consecutive year. 
 Rhode Island, South Carolina and Tennessee placed for the third consecutive year. 
 Missouri and Utah made their second consecutive placement.
 Florida last placed in 2006.
 Mississippi, Oklahoma and Pennsylvania last placed in 2005.
 Indiana and Massachusetts last placed in 2003.
 Minnesota last placed in 2002.
 New Jersey last placed in 1997.
 Nevada breaks an ongoing streak of placements since 2006.

Delegates

Contestant gallery

Contestant notes

Due to accounting errors, Christina Silva was crowned Miss California USA.  When the mistake was discovered a week after the pageant, the real winner Raquel Beezley assumed the title.
Michelle Gillespie, Miss Kansas USA, is the great-great niece of Miss America 1921, Margaret Gorman of Washington, DC.
Three contestants previously competed in the Miss Texas USA and/or Miss Texas Teen USA pageants before winning titles in other states: 
Candice Crawford (Missouri) placed third runner-up at Miss Texas Teen USA 2003 and 2005.  She is the sister of Gossip Girl actor Chace Crawford.
Elisabeth Crawford (Michigan) was a non-finalist at Miss Texas USA 2004 to 2006
Veronica Grabowski (Nevada) competed at the Miss Texas Teen USA 2003 and Miss Texas USA 2007 pageants, finishing as a semifinalist in both years.
Amy Diaz (Rhode Island) and Danielle Roundtree (New York) competed at Miss Florida USA 2007.  Diaz placed third runner-up and Roundtree was a non-finalist.
Abbey Curran (Iowa) was the first contestant with a disability. Curran was born with cerebral palsy.
Amy Diaz (Rhode Island) competed at Miss Earth 2009 in Boracay, Philippines but unplaced.

Judges
Heather Mills - activist; contestant on ABC's season four of Dancing with the Stars
Rob Schneider - actor; comedian; screenwriter; director
Kristian Alfonso - actress on NBC's Days of Our Lives; entrepreneur
Joey Fatone - former member of 'NSync; actor; contestant on ABC's season four of Dancing with the Stars; host of NBC's The Singing Bee
Christian Siriano - winner of season four of Project Runway
Amanda Beard - Olympic Gold Medal swimmer; model
Kelly Carlson - actress on FX's Nip/Tuck
Ken Paves - celebrity hairstylist
Shawne Merriman - outside linebacker for the NFL's San Diego Chargers
George Wayne - Vanity Fair magazine celebrity journalist
Robert Earl - founder and CEO of Planet Hollywood International, Inc.

See also
Miss USA 2007
Miss Universe 2008
Miss Teen USA 2008

Notes

References

External links
Miss USA official website 

2008
April 2008 events in the United States
2008 beauty pageants
2008 in Nevada
Zappos Theater